Jam Shabbir Ali Khan is a Pakistani politician who has been a member of the Provincial Assembly of Sindh since February 2021.

Born to Jam Madad Ali Khan in Sindh, he was elected a member of the Provincial Assembly of Sindh in February 2021 by-election in which he got 48,028 votes and won the PS-43 Sanghar constituency defeating Mushtaq Junejo who got 6,925 votes.

References

Living people
Sindh MPAs 2018–2023
Pakistan People's Party MPAs (Sindh)
Year of birth missing (living people)